Israel–Syria relations refer to the bilateral ties between the State of Israel and the Syrian Arab Republic. The two countries have been locked in a perpetual war since the establishment of Israel in 1948, with their most significant and direct armed engagements being in the First Arab–Israeli War in 1948–1949, the Third Arab–Israeli War in 1967, and the Fourth Arab–Israeli War in 1973. Additionally, Israeli and Syrian forces also saw relatively extensive combat against each other during the Lebanese Civil War, the 1982 Lebanon War, as well as the War of Attrition. Both states have at times signed and held armistice agreements, although all efforts to achieve complete peace have been without success. Syria has never recognized Israel as a legitimate state and does not accept Israeli passports as legally valid for entry into Syrian territory; Israel likewise regards Syria as a hostile state and generally prohibits its citizens from travelling there, with some exceptions and special accommodations being made by both countries for Druze people residing in Syria and the Golan Heights (regarded by the United Nations as Syrian territory, occupied by Israel since 1967). Israel and Syria have never established formal diplomatic relations since the inception of both countries in the mid-20th century. 

In line with the lack of diplomatic relations and continuous state of war, there have been virtually no economic or cultural ties between Israel and Syria, and a limited movement of people across the border. Syria continues to be an active participant in the Arab League's boycott of Israel. Both countries do allow a limited trade of items such as locally-grown apples for the Golan Druze villages, which are located on both sides of the UNDOF ceasefire line, and Syria provides 10 percent of the water supply for the Druze town of Majdal Shams in the Israeli-occupied Golan Heights as a part of an agreement that has been ongoing since the 1980s. The state of peace at the Israel–Syria ceasefire line (which has served as the international border since the 1967 war) has been strained due to the Syrian Civil War, which began in 2011 and is ongoing .

History

1948–1975

Since the 1949 Armistice Agreements, relations between Israel and Syria have been characterized by periods of hostility; ceasefire talks, sometimes through intermediaries; and disengagement agreements, such as the 1974 Israeli–Syrian disengagement agreement. 

Prior to the 1967 Six-Day War, intermittent hostilities centered on the demilitarized zones, water issues and shelling and infiltration from the Golan Heights. Since the war, the focus of negotiations has been "land for peace," in particular a demand that Israel return the Golan Heights to Syria along with Syrian recognition of Israel and establishment of peaceful relations with it, as stipulated in UN Security Council Resolution 242. And yet, in the US-brokered Syrian–Israeli talks during the 1990s, Syria demanded that Israeli future withdrawal would be to the "June 4, 1967 Lines", namely west of the former British Mandate border with Syria. Syria attempted to recover the Golan Heights in the Yom Kippur War, but was unsuccessful, only recovering a small part of it in the 1974 disengagement agreement, while committing to distance its armed forces further eastwards compared with their 1967–1973 positions.

During Lebanese civil war
In 1982, Israel invaded Lebanon to drive out the PLO. Syria sent ground and air forces to assist the Lebanese, but these were largely routed by the Israelis. Syria continued to support Lebanese militias, leading up to Israel's withdrawal in 2000.

1990s peace efforts
The first high-level public talks aimed at a permanent resolution of the conflict between Israel and Syria were held at and after the multilateral Madrid Conference of 1991. Throughout the 1990s several Israeli governments negotiated with Syria's President Hafez Al-Assad. While serious progress was made, they were unsuccessful.

During Damascus spring: 2000–2005
High points of hostility in the 2000s included the Ain es Saheb airstrike (an Israeli Air Force mission against Palestinian militants inside Syria) in 2003 and Operation Orchard (an Israeli air and commando mission against Syria's alleged nuclear program) in 2007.

Syrian alliance with Iran: 2006–present
During the 2006 Lebanon War, Syria threatened to enter the war on Hezbollah's side, provided support to Hezbollah, and allowed Iran to ship supplies to Hezbollah through its territory. Later, Turkey organized peace talks between the two countries, but Syria later withdrew in response to the 2008–2009 Gaza War.

The September 2007 Operation Outside the Box attack by the Israeli Air Force destroyed a facility that Israel claimed was a nuclear site in the Deir ez-Zor region.

In 2010, Syrian President Bashar al-Assad accused Israel of avoiding peace, and Syrian Foreign Minister Walid Muallem warned that in the event of a future war, Israeli cities would be targeted by Syrian missiles. Israeli Foreign Minister Avigdor Lieberman responded by saying that the Syrian military would be defeated in a war with Israel, and Assad and his family would be forced from power. Lieberman also advised Syria to let go of the demand for the Golan Heights. For several months in 2010 Prime Minister Benjamin Netanyahu of Israel engaged in secret, American-brokered discussions with Syria.

During Syrian civil war: 2011–present

Several incidents have taken place on the Israeli–Syrian ceasefire line during the Syrian Civil War, straining the state of peace between the countries. The incidents are considered a spillover of the Quneitra Governorate clashes since 2012 and later incidents between the Syrian Army and the rebels, ongoing on the Syrian-controlled side of the Golan and the Golan Neutral Zone and the Hezbollah involvement in the Syrian Civil War. Through the incidents, which began in late 2012, as of mid-2014, one Israeli civilian was killed and at least 4 soldiers wounded; on the Syrian-controlled side, it is estimated that at least ten soldiers were killed, as well as two unidentified militants, who attempted to penetrate into Israeli-occupied side of the Golan Heights.

On 11 May 2018, Israel urged Syria to reduce the level of Iranian military presence in the country, with Defense Minister Avigdor Lieberman stating: "Throw the Iranians, Qassem Soleimani and the Quds forces out of your country! They are not acting in your interest, they are only hurting you. Their whole presence only brings problems and destruction."

On 10 July 2018, Lieberman did not rule out establishing "some kind of relationship" with Syria under Assad.

On 11 July 2018, Netanyahu stated that Israel was not seeking to take action against Assad, but urged Russia to facilitate the withdrawal of Iranian troops from Syria.

On 2 August 2018, Lieberman stated his belief that Syrian troops regaining control of the country's border with Israel would reduce the chance of conflict in the Golan Heights by providing "a real address, someone responsible, and central rule".

In April 2019, Syria permitted the return of the remains of Zechariah Baumel to Israel in a Russian-brokered deal. In exchange, Israel released two Syrian prisoners as a "goodwill gesture" to Syria in January 2020.

In January 2021, Syria denied reports of a Russia-mediated meeting at the Khmeimim Air Base between former IDF Chief of Staff Gadi Eisenkot and Syrian National Security Bureau head Ali Mamlouk.

In February 2021, Israel took part in a Russian-brokered prisoner exchange with Syria, where Syria released an Israeli woman who had entered Syria in exchange for two Syrian shepherds who had entered Israel. According to the Times of Israel, there was more to this agreement than purely a prisoner exchange, but that these details had been redacted by an Israeli military censor on media coverage of the agreement. Subsequent foreign media reports revealed that Israel had supplied COVID-19 vaccines to Syria as part of the agreement.

On May 19, 2022, the Israeli military said it activated its missile defences after wrongly identifying a danger near the Lebanon border.

On May 20, 2022, an Israeli "aggression" launched from the Golan Heights and targeting southern sections of Damascus killed three individuals and inflicted minor material damage, according to the Syrian Ministry of Defense.

Israeli humanitarian aid to Syrians

Operation Good Neighbor (2016-2018)
In June 2016, the Israeli military began Operation Good Neighbor, a multi-faceted humanitarian relief operation to prevent starvation of Syrians who live along the border and provide basic or advanced medical treatment.

The aid consisted of medical care, water, electricity, education or food and was given to Syrians near the ceasefire line between Israel and Syria, often escorted across by Israeli soldiers. Over 200,000 Syrians received such aid, and more than 4,000 of them were treated in Israeli hospitals from 2013 to September 2018. Many of the treated victims were civilians, often children. Allegations have been made that some were rebel fighters from the Free Syrian Army. This theory is supported by the claim that Israel had a strategic interest in aiding the rebels; they fought against both ISIL and Iranian-allied forces.

Israeli humanitarian assistance in aftermath of Syrian earthquake (2023-)
Shortly after of the 2023 Turkey and Syria earthquake, the State of Israel received a requestGovernment of Turkey for assistance from the Israel Defense Force in search and rescue and recovery efforts, and the IDF deployed a large team of approximately 500 search and rescue professionals to assist the Turks in the aftermath of the earthquake. Prime Minister Benjamin Netanyahu has said he also received a request from Syria through Russian interlocutors to send aid to Syria and assist in search and rescue operations there even though the two nations are technically in a state of war and do not have relations. Israel has plans to send aid to Syria, including humanitarian aid, medication, blankets, and tents. In contrast to the assistance provided by Israel to Turkey, any assistance provided to Syria by the Israeli government would not involve the military, according to IDF spokesman Ran Kochav who stated that the military was not involved in potential aid to Syria.

Economic relations
 

There have been virtually no economic relations between the two countries since the creation of the state of Israel, and a limited movement of people across the border. Syria continues to be an active participant in the Arab boycott of Israel.

As an exception, since 2004 Syria has accepted apples from the Israeli-occupied Golan Heights through the Quneitra crossing. In 2010, Syria accepted some 10,000 tons of apples grown by Druze farmers in the Golan Heights. Israeli minister Ayoub Kara called for an agreement with Syria over the supply of water to towns in the Golan Heights. Today, 10% of water in the Druze town of Majdal Shams is supplied by Syria, from the Ein al-Toufah spring. This arrangement has been in place for 25 years.

Tourism and cultural exchange
In 2010, the Israeli government authorized a pilgrimage to Syria by a group of 300 Druze citizens of Israel interested in visiting religious sites there. A group of dancers from five Druze villages in Israel was sent to Aleppo to perform in a dabka competition. Civilians are permitted to cross the border at Quneitra for university studies and marriage. Syrian citizens of the Golan are entitled to free tuition, books and lodging. Since 1993, 67 Syrian brides have crossed into the Golan Heights and 11 brides from Golan have crossed into Syria.

See also
 Operation Good Neighbour
 Israel's role in the Syrian civil war
 Independent Israel–Syria peace initiatives
 Israel–Syria Mixed Armistice Commission
 War over Water (Jordan river)

References

Further reading

External links
 Agricultural trade potential following peace in the Middle East: The case of Syria and Israel
 Is Israel Facing War with Hizbullah and Syria?

 
Syria
Bilateral relations of Syria